Monika Leu (born 24 August 1973) is a German sailor and former yacht racer who competed in the 2004 Summer Olympics.

References

1973 births
Living people
German female sailors (sport)
Olympic sailors of Germany
Sailors at the 2004 Summer Olympics – 470
Place of birth missing (living people)